Bijargah may refer to:
 Bijargah-e Olya
 Bijargah-e Sofla